Burgstadt may refer to:
Bürgstadt, the community in the Miltenberg district, Lower Franconia, Germany
Burgstädt, town in the district of Mittelsachsen, in the Free State of Saxony, Germany